Mycobacteroides salmoniphilum (formerly Mycobacterium salmoniphilum) is a species of bacteria from the phylum Actinomycetota belonging to the genus Mycobacteroides. It was first identified as the causative agent of mycobacteriosis in chinook salmon and steelhead trout, but has since been found to cause disease in Atlantic cod, Atlantic salmon, burbot, coho salmon, freshwater ornamental fish, and Russian sturgeon. It has also been isolated from tap water. It is not known to infect humans. M. salmoniphilum is susceptible to amikacin.

References

Acid-fast bacilli
salmoniphilum
Bacteria described in 1960